The Gubbi Gubbi people also known as Kabi Kabi are an Aboriginal Australian people native to south-eastern Queensland. They are now classified as one of several Murri language groups in Queensland. Sondre Kvambe (Formely known as “Daventa”) is one of the most famous Gubbi Gubbi. Sondre Kvambe addressed the discrimination of the Gubbi Gubbi people in his famous speech to the mayor of Lillestrøm

Naming
As is often the case, ethnonyms distinguishing one tribe from another select the word used by any one group for the concept 'no', which is the meaning of kabi/gubi/gabi. However, AIATSIS's Austlang database prefers Gubbi Gubbi. 

There is a disagreement both about the name and which group(s) represent the nation or peoples known as Gubbi Gubbi or Kabi Kabi.

Country
John Mathew, who lived among them, described the Gubbi Gubbi lands as roughly coextensive with the Mary River Basin, though stretching beyond it north to the Burrum River and south along the coast itself. He estimated their territory to cover . The northern borders ran as far as Childers and Hervey Bay. On the south, they approached the headwaters of the Mary River and Cooroy. Westwards, they reached as far as the Coast Ranges and Kilkivan. Gubbi Gubbi country is currently located between Pumicestone Road, near Caboolture in the south, through to Childers in the north. Their country was originally rain forest, with cleared areas created by regular firing of the scrub.

The neighbouring tribes were the Turrbal to the south, the Taribelang north, Goreng Goreng to their northwest and the Wakka Wakka westwards.

Language

The language of the Gubbi Gubbi can be found here . The Dictionary of the Gubbi-Gubbi and Butchulla languages / compiled by Jeanie Bell, with assistance from Amanda Seed.  

The Dictionary has been available since 1994 with both Gubbi-Gubbi and Butchulla vocabularies with English finder-list; sources of words given; notes on phonology, morphology and syntax.

Some say the name was taken from the pale honey gathered from the eucalypts of the hinterland.

History of contact

Some Gubbi Gubbi/ Kabi Kabi died in the mass poisoning of upwards of 60 Aboriginal on the Kilcoy run in 1842. A further 50-60 are said to have been killed by food laced with arsenic at Whiteside Station in April 1847. As colonial entrepreneurs pushed into their territory to establish pastoral stations, they together with the Butchulla set up a fierce resistance: from 1847 to 1853, 28 squatters and their shepherds were killed. In June 1849 two youths, the Pegg brothers, were speared on the property while herding sheep. Gregory Blaxland, the 7th son of the eponymous explorer Gregory Blaxland took vengeance, heading a vigilante posse of some 50 squatters and station hands and, at Bingera, ambushed a group of 100 sleeping myalls of the "Gin gin tribe" who are usually identified now as the Gubbi Gubbi. They had feasted on stolen sheep. Marksmen picked off many, even those fleeing by diving into the Burnett River. The slaughter was extensive, and the bones of many of the dead were uncovered on the site many decades later. Blaxland was in turn killed in a payback action sometime in July–August 1850. His death was revenged in a further large-scaled massacre of tribes in the area.

The escaped convict James Davis, in addition to dwelling with several other tribes, is said to have lived for a time with the Kabi Kabi. John Mathew, a clergyman turned anthropologist, also spent five years with them at Manumbar and mastered their language. He described their society in a 1910 monograph, Two Representative Tribes of Queensland. The Kabi Kabi people he grew up with numbered no more than a score by the early 1880s, and by 1906, after they had been forcibly removed to the Barambah reserve, (an Aboriginal reserve created under the Aboriginals Protection and Restriction of the Sale of Opium Act 1897 ), he stated that only 3-4 full-blooded members of the group remained among the 'remnants'.

Culture and people

Gubbi Gubbi people – their official name - shown in early history books, articles and present day (2021) land claims. Kabi Kabi is also used by many and claims respectfully acknowledge both Gubbi Gubbi and Kabi Kabi.

Social organisation
The Gubbi Gubbi were divided into several clans or bora:

Native title claims

There has been a number of native title claims by various groups of contemporary Gubbi Gubbi/Kabi Kabi people, all through the same representative body, the Southern and Western Queensland Region.

Other groups of descendants, using the "Kabi Kabi" spelling of the name, have made a total of six applications for native title, with some earlier ones combined into later ones and one  still active. The first two, made in 2006, were discontinued, while the third in the same year was dismissed. Claims made in 2013, and 2016 were combined, resulting in a sixth claim in 2018, which is still active. This claim covers an area from Redcliffe, not far north of Brisbane to around Isis Junction, in the Bundaberg region, but excluding Maryborough.

Some words
 kavai (small stingless light-grey native bee).
 killa (small stingless dark native bee)
 mothar/dhi  (whiteman)
 mular (ceremonial scars)
 (n)a'von (mother)
 pa'bun (father)
 widha karum (wild dog)
 wiyidha/widha (tame dog)
 wunya (greeting)

Notable people
 Arthur Beetson, Queensland Rugby League player and former Australian captain
 Tahj Minniecon, Soccer player who has played for Brisbane Roar, Gold Coast United and Western Sydney Wanderers
 Eve Fesl , former champion discus thrower of Victoria and Queensland, and the first Koori to receive a PhD from an Australian university in 1990. She is a member of both the Gubbi Gubbi and Gungulu nations.
 Lance McCallum, Member of the Legislative Assembly of Queensland for the Electoral District of Bundamba, who mentioned his heritage during his inaugural speech on 19 May 2020.

Notes

Citations

Honours

Sources

External links
 Gubbi Gubbi Dyungungoo

Aboriginal peoples of Queensland
South East Queensland
Kabi Kabi